This is a list of Central Oklahoma Bronchos who were selected in the NFL draft. The University of Central Oklahoma (UCO) has had 18 players selected in the National Football League (NFL) draft since the league began holding drafts in 1936. This includes two players selected in the third round. The San Francisco 49ers, Detroit Lions and the St.Louis/Phoenix Cardinals have drafted two Bronchos.

Each NFL franchise seeks to add new players through the annual NFL Draft. The draft rules were last updated in 2009. The team with the worst record from the previous year picks first, the next-worst team second, and so on. Teams that did not make the playoffs are ordered by their regular-season record with any remaining ties broken by strength of schedule. Playoff participants are sequenced after non-playoff teams, based on their round of elimination (wild card, division, conference, and Super Bowl).

Key

Players selected

References
General

 
 

Specific

Lists of National Football League draftees by college football team
 
University of Central Oklahoma-related lists
Central Oklahoma Bronchos NFL Draft